Joseph Guédé Gnadou (born 28 August 1994) is an Ivorian professional footballer who currently plays as a forward for AS FAR.

Career statistics

Club

Notes

References

1994 births
Living people
Ivorian footballers
Association football forwards
Botola players
UAE Pro League players
Academie de Foot Amadou Diallo players
AS FAR (football) players
Emirates Club players
Ivorian expatriate footballers
Ivorian expatriate sportspeople in Morocco
Expatriate footballers in Morocco
Ivorian expatriate sportspeople in the United Arab Emirates
Expatriate footballers in the United Arab Emirates